Riltsi is a village in Blagoevgrad Municipality, in Blagoevgrad Province, Bulgaria. It is situated 3 kilometers north of Blagoevgrad, in the foothills of Rila mountain.

References

Villages in Blagoevgrad Province